Pasiano di Pordenone is a comune (municipality) in the Province of Pordenone in the Italian region Friuli-Venezia Giulia, located about  northwest of Trieste and about  south of Pordenone.

Geography
Pasiano borders the following municipalities: Azzano Decimo, Gorgo al Monticano, Mansuè, Meduna di Livenza, Porcia, Pordenone, Prata di Pordenone, Pravisdomini.

People
Damiano Damiani

Twin towns
 Canton de Fronsac, France

References

External links

  

Cities and towns in Friuli-Venezia Giulia